The 1974 Austrian Grand Prix was a Formula One motor race held at Österreichring on 18 August 1974. It was race 12 of 15 in both the 1974 World Championship of Drivers and the 1974 International Cup for Formula One Manufacturers. The 54-lap race was won by Carlos Reutemann, driving a Brabham-Ford, with Denny Hulme second in a McLaren-Ford and James Hunt third in a Hesketh-Ford.

Qualifying

Qualifying classification 

*Positions with a pink background indicate drivers that failed to qualify

Race

Classification

Championship standings after the race

Drivers' Championship standings

Constructors' Championship standings

References

Austrian Grand Prix
Grand Prix
Austrian Grand Prix